Gordana Perkučin (born May 7, 1962 in Novi Kneževac) is a Yugoslav and Serbian table tennis player who competed in the 1988 Summer Olympics and in the 1992 Summer Olympics.

Table tennis career
In 1988 she won the bronze medal in the women's doubles together with Jasna Fazlić at the 1988 Summer Olympics. Four years later she competed as an Independent Olympic Participant but was eliminated in the first round.

She won two World Championship medals; a bronze at the 1979 World Table Tennis Championships in the doubles with Erzsebet Palatinus and a silver medal at the 1989 World Table Tennis Championships in the mixed doubles with Zoran Kalinić.

See also
 List of table tennis players
 List of World Table Tennis Championships medalists

References

External links
profile

1962 births
Living people
People from Novi Kneževac
Yugoslav table tennis players
Serbian female table tennis players
Table tennis players at the 1988 Summer Olympics
Table tennis players at the 1992 Summer Olympics
Olympic table tennis players of Yugoslavia
Olympic table tennis players as Independent Olympic Participants
Olympic bronze medalists for Yugoslavia
Olympic medalists in table tennis
Medalists at the 1988 Summer Olympics